Brian Reginald Gant (born April 23, 1952) is a Canadian retired soccer player who spent nine seasons in the North American Soccer League and played fifteen games with the Canadian national team.

Player

Professional
After playing college soccer at Simon Fraser University, Gant signed with the Vancouver Whitecaps of the North American Soccer League in 1974.  After three seasons in Vancouver, he moved to the Portland Timbers in 1977. He remained with the Timbers until they folded in 1982, playing a total of six outdoor and two indoor seasons with them.

International
Gant made 17 combined international ("A" and "B") appearances for Canada from 1973 and 1981. He played in two cycles of FIFA World Cup Qualifiers. He also played for Canada in eight exhibition matches against club or select teams.

Coach
Since 1990, Gant has been a youth coach with F.C. Portland, a youth soccer club in Portland, Oregon.  He also coached girls' high school soccer at Catlin Gabel School in Portland, and as such was named District 1 Coach of the Year for 2003. Gant led the Catlin Gabel Eagles to 13 state championships, 11 consecutively from 1994 to 2004.

Personal
Brian's brother Bruce Gant was also a professional and international soccer player. His brother-in-law Bill Sinclair was a teammate with the New Westminster Blues. His niece Christine Sinclair is a star Canadian player for Portland Thorns FC. His wife is a school teacher and sports coach.

Sources

www.fcportland.org
www.oregonlive.com
 NASL stats

References

1952 births
Living people
Association football defenders
Canadian expatriate sportspeople in the United States
Canadian expatriate soccer players
Canada men's international soccer players
Canadian soccer players
Expatriate soccer players in the United States
North American Soccer League (1968–1984) indoor players
North American Soccer League (1968–1984) players
Soccer players from Portland, Oregon
Soccer players from Vancouver
Simon Fraser Clan men's soccer players
Simon Fraser University alumni
Portland Timbers (1975–1982) players
Vancouver Whitecaps (1974–1984) players